Ben Sahar (changed the Hebrew spelling of his surname from ; born 10 August 1989) is an Israeli professional footballer who plays as a striker for Maccabi Haifa and the Israel national team.

At 16, Sahar was the equivalent of a second-year apprentice at Chelsea He first caught the eye of Chelsea staff in an Under-16 fixture against Ireland in 2004. He has since played for the Israeli Under-21 national team and the Israeli national team. Before transferring to Chelsea, he was on the Hapoel Tel Aviv books, and while he was promoted to the first team by the manager Itzhak Shum, he did not feature in any matches, since his transfer was completed before the start of the 2006–07 season.

Early life
Sahar was born in Holon, Israel, to a Jewish family. His father is Israeli-born and of Sephardic Jewish (Tunisian-Jewish) descent, who works as an electrician, and his mother teaches sports. He grew up in the city of Modi'in, Israel. Before his transfer to Chelsea F.C., he acquired a Polish passport as well, on account of his Israeli-born mother who is of Ashkenazi Jewish (Polish-Jewish and Latvian-Jewish) descent, that made him eligible to play as a non-foreigner in EU leagues including the UK.

As an Israeli citizen, Sahar was due to return to Israel for a three-year spell of military service in the IDF. However, Israeli lawmakers were working on a legislation (nicknamed "The Ben Sahar Law") that would have allowed Sahar to complete a national service (Sherut Leumi) term in England instead. The law did not pass and as a result, Sahar was drafted into the Israel Defense Forces. Under the terms of his military service, he had to visit his military base every time he was on vacation in Israel.

Club career
Sahar began playing football in his hometown of Modi'in, Israel. There, he was enrolled in the Sportop Football Academy, before joining the youth ranks of Hapoel Tel Aviv.

Chelsea
Sahar signed for Chelsea of the English Premier League in May 2006 from Hapoel Tel Aviv for £320,000, having previously spent a two-month period on trial at Stamford Bridge.

Sahar was called up to the Chelsea first team to play Macclesfield Town in the FA Cup on 6 January 2007, and made his debut coming on as a substitute for Salomon Kalou in the 76th minute. Four days later, Sahar came on as a substitute in the 60th minute of Chelsea's 1–1 draw with Wycombe Wanderers in the League Cup. He made his Premiership debut on 13 January 2007, coming off the bench to replace Arjen Robben in the 82nd minute of the match against Wigan Athletic. He later made two additional Premier League substitute appearances for the Blues that season, against Manchester United and Everton.

Queens Park Rangers
Sahar joined then Championship side Queens Park Rangers, on loan, for the beginning of the 2007–08 season, on 26 July 2007, for an initial three-month period. He followed this up with two goals in a pre-season friendly against Premier League side Fulham, earning Queens Park Rangers a 2–1 win. Following this, his loan-deal was then extended to 2 January 2008. Sahar suffered numerous injuries during this period and did not manage to score during his nine league appearances.

Sheffield Wednesday
After Sahar returned from an injury-plagued spell at QPR, Sheffield Wednesday completed the signing of Sahar on an initial one-month loan from Chelsea on 21 February 2008. This was extended until 19 April, and again until the end of the season on 4 May 2008. Sahar scored his first goal for Sheffield Wednesday against Crystal Palace on 22 March 2008. He followed this up with further strikes against Scunthorpe United and Norwich City. The latter goal was important as it ensured Sheffield Wednesday's survival in the Championship.

Sahar finished with three goals from 12 appearances for Sheffield Wednesday in his second loan spell in the Championship.

Portsmouth
On 12 June 2008, it was reported that Sahar was in the Netherlands to discuss another season-long loan with Dutch club NEC Nijmegen. However, according to NEC officials a deal could not be signed with Sahar due to financial issues. Instead he agreed to a six-month loan deal with FA Cup winners Portsmouth, and on 1 July he was officially unveiled as a Portsmouth player. Sahar joined Premier League side Portsmouth on a six-month loan deal on 1 July 2008, and was given the number 26 shirt. He featured regularly in pre-season for Portsmouth, making seven appearances and scoring against Nigerian Premier League champions Kano Pillars, Conference South side Havant & Waterlooville, and Southern Football League Division One South & West side Gosport Borough.

However, Sahar was forced to endure yet another unsuccessful loan spell. Despite being involved in many of Portsmouth's pre-season matches, Sahar did not play once for Portsmouth; he was an unused substitute in three of their matches. "If I had played a few games and they said I wasn't good enough, then fine. But the fact is that I haven't been given that chance to shine," Sahar said of his disappointment at not being given one opportunity to prove himself.

De Graafschap
Sahar joined Eredivisie side De Graafschap on loan on 2 January 2009. He played for De Graafschap until the end of the season. He played his first match for De Graafschap in a friendly against Turkish club Sivasspor. He scored his first two goals for De Graafschap in a friendly match against Belgian team K.V. Mechelen. He scored his first goal in the Eredivisie on 17 January 2009 in his debut match, against Willem II. After only 17 minutes, Sahar received a pass from Luuk de Jong and then curled the shot into the top corner, after passing a defender in the  box. His second goal came in an away game against fellow relegation strugglers, Roda JC. His third goal for De Graafschap came in a home game against SC Heerenveen. In this game, he finished well to score the game's first goal with his left foot, after good play from Luuk de Jong. His fourth and fifth goals came in the home game against NEC Nijmegen. Sahar scored a penalty for the opening goal after missing an earlier penalty attempt. He scored his second goal of the match with a close range strike. This match finished in a 2–2 draw. De Graafschap finished second-bottom in the 2008–09 Eredivisie. This meant that they would have to participate in play-offs with teams from the Dutch second division in order to retain their place in the Eredivisie. In their first play-off match against MVV Maastricht, Sahar scored a goal within 60 seconds of the match's commencement to set up a 3–2 away win for De Graafschap.

Sahar finished with five goals and one assist in 16 appearances for De Graafschap in the 2008–09 Eredivisie, and in the relegation playoffs he scored one goal and made two assists in six games, making of a total of six goals and three assists in 22 games.

Espanyol
Sahar moved to Espanyol for a fee of £1million on a four-year deal, after leaving Stamford Bridge in the summer of 2009. He was presented with the number 14 jersey. On 2 August 2009, Sahar scored two goals in a friendly match against Liverpool as a substitute, also picking up the man-of-the-match award in a 3–0 win. These were the second and third goals of the match, scored at the club's inaugural match at their new stadium, the Estadi Cornellà-El Prat. Sahar scored his first league goal for Espanyol on 23 September 2009, with a header in a 2–1 victory over Málaga; also his club's first goal at the stadium in a competitive match.

Hapoel Tel Aviv
Despite the objections of his agent, Ronen Katzav, on 20 July 2010, Sahar joined his youth club Hapoel Tel Aviv on a one-year loan. Hapoel Tel Aviv also purchased 10% of the transfer rights for £100,000. Sahar scored his first goal for Hapoel Tel Aviv against FK Aktobe from Kazakhstan in the 2010–11 UEFA Champions League third qualifying round, after a pass from Itay Shechter and scored in the final qualifying round in the away leg versus Red Bull Salzburg.

Sahar found great difficulty scoring in the Ligat Ha'Al upon arrival. Assistant manager, Yossi Abuksis attributed this to a mental difficulty that Sahar created for himself. Sahar came back to Israel as a superstar and the pressures that came with this status were difficult to bear at the start of the season. When Itay Shechter went out with an injury midseason, Sahar capitalized on the increased playing time to create a striking partnership with Toto Tamuz.

Auxerre
On 4 July 2011, Sahar joined Ligue 1 side Auxerre on a one-year loan. Auxerre had an option to sign Sahar permanently for a fee of €1.5 million which the club did not take advantage of at the end of the player's loan spell.

Hertha BSC
On 19 July 2012, Sahar signed for 2. Bundesliga side Hertha BSC on a free transfer from Espanyol. He made his league debut for the side on 16 September 2012, coming on in the 82nd minute in Hertha's 2–0 win over VfR Aalen.

Arminia Bielefeld
He was on loan to Arminia Bielefeld from January 2014 until June 2014.

Willem II
On 21 July 2014, it was announced that Sahar had signed a one-year deal with an option for another year with Dutch Eredivisie side Willem II. He finished the season with 7 goals, but Willem II decided not to exercise the option.

Hapoel Be'er Sheva
On 8 July 2015, Sahar signed to Hapoel Be'er Sheva on a three-year deal. He finished the season with 9 goals contributing to the team's league championship, its first in 40 years.

International career
On 7 October 2006, Sahar made his debut for the Israel U-21s in a playoff against France – scoring Israel's goal in the away leg which ended 1–1, on the way to Israel's shock qualification to UEFA U-21 Championship 2007 with a 2–1 aggregate win.

On 7 February 2007, at the age of 17-and-a-half, Sahar became the youngest player to ever play for the Israel national football team, in a friendly match against Ukraine (a feat since surpassed by Gai Assulin). In doing so, he became Chelsea's youngest player to earn an international cap. He earned his second cap against England on 24 March 2007, coming on as a substitute in the 69th minute. Sahar became the youngest player to score for the Israel national football team in his third appearance with the team on 28 March 2007, scoring two goals against Estonia as a substitute in Israel's 4–0 win. This was the youngest international goal scored by a Chelsea player. Sahar scored his third international goal on 6 September 2008, with an equaliser in the 90th minute against Switzerland in a 2010 FIFA World Cup qualifier, following up with his fourth and fifth international goals a year later in the 2010 World Cup qualifier against Luxembourg on 9 September 2009.

Career statistics

International
Scores and results list Israel's goal tally first, score column indicates score after each Sahar goal.

Honours
Hapoel Tel Aviv
 Israel State Cup: 2010–11

Hertha BSC
 2. Bundesliga: 2012–13

Hapoel Beer Sheva
 Israeli Premier League: 2015–16, 2016–17, 2017–18
 Israel State Cup: 2019–20
 Toto Cup: 2016–17
 Israel Super Cup: 2016

Maccabi Haifa
 Israeli Premier League: 2021–22
 Toto Cup: 2021–22
 Israel Super Cup: 2021

See also
List of select Jewish football (association; soccer) players

References

External links
 
 

1989 births
Living people
Footballers from Holon
Footballers from Modi'in-Maccabim-Re'ut
Israeli Ashkenazi Jews
Israeli Sephardi Jews
Israeli Mizrahi Jews
Polish Ashkenazi Jews
Polish Sephardi Jews
Israeli footballers
Polish footballers
Israeli people of Tunisian-Jewish descent
Israeli people of Latvian-Jewish descent
Israeli people of Polish-Jewish descent
Polish people of Jewish descent
Polish people of African descent
Polish people of Latvian descent
Citizens of Poland through descent
Association football forwards
Hapoel Tel Aviv F.C. players
Chelsea F.C. players
Portsmouth F.C. players
Queens Park Rangers F.C. players
English Football League players
Sheffield Wednesday F.C. players
De Graafschap players
Eredivisie players
RCD Espanyol footballers
AJ Auxerre players
Hertha BSC players
Arminia Bielefeld players
Willem II (football club) players
Hapoel Be'er Sheva F.C. players
APOEL FC players
Maccabi Haifa F.C. players
Israel under-21 international footballers
Israel international footballers
Premier League players
La Liga players
Israeli Premier League players
Ligue 1 players
2. Bundesliga players
Israeli expatriate footballers
Polish expatriate footballers
Expatriate footballers in England
Expatriate footballers in the Netherlands
Expatriate footballers in Spain
Expatriate footballers in France
Expatriate footballers in Germany
Expatriate footballers in Cyprus
Israeli expatriate sportspeople in England
Israeli expatriate sportspeople in the Netherlands
Israeli expatriate sportspeople in Spain
Israeli expatriate sportspeople in France
Israeli expatriate sportspeople in Germany
Israeli expatriate sportspeople in Cyprus
Polish expatriate sportspeople in England
Polish expatriate sportspeople in the Netherlands
Polish expatriate sportspeople in Spain
Polish expatriate sportspeople in France
Polish expatriate sportspeople in Germany
Polish expatriate sportspeople in Cyprus